Miguel Rovira (born 7 November 1962) is a Spanish field hockey player. He competed in the men's tournament at the 1988 Summer Olympics.

References

External links
 

1962 births
Living people
Spanish male field hockey players
Olympic field hockey players of Spain
Field hockey players at the 1988 Summer Olympics
Field hockey players from Barcelona